In the mathematical field of category theory, an allegory is a category that has some of the structure of the category Rel of sets and binary relations between them. Allegories can be used as an abstraction of categories of relations, and in this sense the theory of allegories is a generalization of relation algebra to relations between different sorts. Allegories are also useful in defining and investigating certain constructions in category theory, such as exact completions.

In this article we adopt the convention that morphisms compose from right to left, so  means "first do , then do ".

Definition

An allegory is a category in which
 every pair of morphisms  with common domain/codomain is associated with an intersection, i.e. a morphism 
all such that
 intersections are idempotent:  commutative:  and associative: 
 anti-involution distributes over intersection: 
 the modularity law is satisfied: 
Here, we are abbreviating using the order defined by the intersection:  means 

A first example of an allegory is the category of sets and relations. Intersection of morphisms is (set-theoretic) intersection of relations.

Regular categories and allegories

Allegories of relations in regular categories

In the presence of pullbacks and a proper factorization system, one can define the composition of relations. The composition  is found by first pulling back the cospan  and then taking the jointly-monic image of the resulting span 

Composition of relations will be associative if the factorization system is appropriately stable. The identity relations are the diagonals 

A regular category (a category with finite limits and images in which covers are stable under pullback) has a stable regular epi/mono factorization system. The category of relations for a regular category is always an allegory. Anti-involution is defined by turning the source/target of the relation around, and intersections are intersections of subobjects, computed by pullback.

Maps in allegories, and tabulations

A morphism  in an allegory  is called a map if it is entire  and deterministic  Another way of saying this is that a map is a morphism that has a right adjoint in  when  is considered, using the local order structure, as a 2-category. Maps in an allegory are closed under identity and composition.

In an allegory, a morphism  is tabulated by a pair of maps  and  if  and  An allegory is called tabular if every morphism has a tabulation. For a regular category , the allegory  is always tabular. On the other hand, for any tabular allegory , the category  of maps is a locally regular category: it has pullbacks, equalizers, and images that are stable under pullback.

Unital allegories and regular categories of maps

An allegory with a unit is called unital. Given a tabular allegory , the category  is a regular category (it has a terminal object) if and only if  is unital.

More sophisticated kinds of allegory
Additional properties of allegories can be axiomatized. Distributive allegories have a union-like operation that is suitably well-behaved, and division allegories have a generalization of the division operation of relation algebra. Power allegories are distributive division allegories with additional powerset-like structure. The connection between allegories and regular categories can be developed into a connection between power allegories and toposes.

References
 

 

Category theory
Mathematical relations